Ağzıdelik is a village in Tarsus  district of Mersin Province, Turkey. At    it is situated in Çukurova (Cilicia of the antiquity) plains to the west of Berdan River. The population of Ağzıdelik  is 210  as of 2011.

References

Villages in Tarsus District